Michael Butler (November 26, 1926 – November 7, 2022) was an American theatrical producer best known for bringing the rock musical Hair from the Public Theater to Broadway in 1968. During his time as Hair producer he was dubbed "the hippie millionaire" by the press. His other Broadway production credits include the play Lenny in 1971 and the musical Reggae in 1980.

Early life
Butler was born in Chicago into a wealthy family. In the early 19th century, his ancestors started a paper company on the Fox River in St. Charles, Illinois, and supplied paper for the U.S. Congress. The business was later moved to Chicago, where it was at one time one of the city's oldest family-owned businesses, which later diversified into dairy, ranching and aviation. Butler's father helped found the village of Oak Brook, Illinois and the Oak Brook Polo Club.

Butler is the godson of Tyrone Power and, in his early twenties, he lived with Power and his wife, actress Linda Christian. Through Power's friend, film director Edmund Goulding, he befriended the Kennedy family, particularly Joe and John F. Kennedy (JFK). Butler and JFK often socialized in Hyannisport, Greenwich Village and Newport, Rhode Island.

Early career
Butler served as Special Advisor to then-Senator John F. Kennedy on the Middle East, the chancellor of the Lincoln Academy, the Commissioner of the Port of Chicago, the president of the Organization of Economic Development in Illinois, an assistant to Illinois Governor Otto Kerner, Jr., and the president of the Illinois Sports Council. He was a Democratic candidate in Du Page County for the State Senate.

Hair
In 1967, Butler was preparing to run for the US Senate when he began to discuss the Vietnam War with a young student who worked as a gardener at his home.  As a result of those discussions, Butler developed an anti-war focus. Later that year in New York City, while on business related to Otto Kerner, Jr.'s Commission about Civil Disorders, he attended the show Hair at the Public Theater  and, noting its strong anti-war statement, decided to obtain the rights to the show. Hair opened on Broadway in April 1968 and became a huge success, running for 1,750 performances, and leading to many other productions. By the time the Broadway production closed in 1972, Butler had overseen nine national productions and nineteen international productions.

Activism
Around the time of his first association with Hair, Butler became a political activist. Before the 1968 Democratic National Convention in Chicago, he arranged a meeting between Chicago mayor Richard Daley and Abbie Hoffman, recommending that the party cultivate the Yippie vote. He held "Cause" meetings in Oak Brook, Illinois in the summer of 1969 with Tom Smothers, Peter Yarrow, and Black Panther Fred Hampton, among others. Butler donated hundreds of thousands of dollars to left-leaning causes, and was on Richard Nixon's Enemies List.

Personal life
Butler dated Candice Bergen, Nati Abascal and Audrey Hepburn, with whom he had a relationship in the early 1950s before her marriage to Mel Ferrer. Butler was involved in Hepburn accepting a role in the New York production of the play Ondine, where she worked with Ferrer not long before marrying him. He has a son, Adam, from his 1962 marriage to Loyce Stinson Hand.

Butler died on November 7, 2022, in Santa Barbara, California, at the age of 95.

References

External links
 Official website
 Michael Butler blog

 Michael Butler interview on Culture Catch
Rado, James, Feb 14, 2003, "Hairstory - The Story Behind the Story", hairthemusical.com. Retrieved on April 11, 2008

1926 births
2022 deaths
American theatre managers and producers
Businesspeople from Chicago
Illinois Democrats
John F. Kennedy
North American Soccer League (1968–1984) executives
People from Oak Brook, Illinois